Chlorocypha selysi is a species of jewel damselfly in the family Chlorocyphidae.

The IUCN conservation status of Chlorocypha selysi is "LC", least concern, with no immediate threat to the species' survival. The IUCN status was reviewed in 2018.

Subspecies
These two subspecies belong to the species Chlorocypha selysi:
 Chlorocypha selysi nigeriensis Gambles, 1975
 Chlorocypha selysi selysi

References

Further reading

 

Chlorocyphidae
Articles created by Qbugbot
Insects described in 1899